Bon Rud District is a district (bakhsh) in Isfahan County, Isfahan Province, Iran. At the 2006 census, its population was 26,285, in 6,934 families.  The District has one city: Varzaneh. The District has two rural districts (dehestan): Gavkhuni Rural District and Rudasht-e Sharqi Rural District.

References 

Isfahan County
Districts of Isfahan Province

fa:بخش بن‌رود